The Triprayar Boat Race (Malayalam: തൃപ്രയാര്‍ ജലോത്സവം) is a popular Vallam Kali held in the Conolly Canal in Triprayar of Thrissur District, Kerala, India. The boat race is conducted by the Thriprayar Arts and Sports Club in front of the Shree Rama Temple. The race is for 3 kilometre from Vennakkadavu to Triprayar.

Winners

Other races in Kerala
 Kumarakom Boat Race
 Nehru Trophy Boat Race
 Kandassankadavu Boat Race
 President's Trophy Boat Race
 Aranmula Uthrattadi Vallamkali

References

Paddling
Boat races in Thrissur